Norwegian Native Art is the third full-length album by the Norwegian viking metal band Einherjer. It was released on 11 September 2000 by Native North Records.

Track listing
 "Wyrd of the Dead" – 4:51	
 "Doomfaring" – 4:45	
 "Hugin's Eyes" – 4:15	
 "Burning Yggdrasil" – 5:23	
 "Crimson Rain" – 5:17	
 "Howl Ravens Come" – 5:05	
 "Draconian Umpire" – 5:30	
 "Regicide" – 4:23	

This album was re-released on 23 February 2005 by Tabu Recordings with a new cover artwork, the previously unreleased track "Oskorei" from the Blot session and the "Ironbound" video clip.

Credits
Ragnar Vikse – vocals
Frode Glesnes – guitar, vocals
Aksel Herløe – guitar
Gerhard Storesund – drums, synthesizer

Guest musicians
Stein Sund – bass guitar
Hanne E. Andersen – Valkyrian vocals
Andy LaRocque – solo in "Doomfaring"

References

Einherjer albums
2000 albums